John Edward Roache (July 19, 1940 – March 3, 1999) was an American pianist, and prolific MIDI sequencer, exponent, and composer of ragtime; notable for his involvement with and contribution to the international "Ragtime Ring"1 and eminent, affiliated Swedish Ragtime Society2 (which houses a number of Roache's creations and a posthumous biography pertaining to him3, alongside works by a number of contemporary ragtime composers). Monument to his work in this field is his expansive MIDI library4, which is maintained in his memory to the present day, and comprises – for the most part – his own output.

External links 
The Ragtime Ring Webring Page
Oleg Mezjuev's Swedish Ragtime Site
A more detailed biography
John Roache's MIDI library

1940 births
1999 deaths
American jazz pianists
American male pianists
Ragtime composers
20th-century American composers
20th-century American pianists
20th-century American male musicians
American male jazz musicians